State Route 154 (SR 154) (also known as the Chumash Highway or unofficially as San Marcos Pass Road after the signage) is a state highway in the U.S. state of California that runs from Los Olivos to Santa Barbara, crossing the San Marcos Pass in the Santa Ynez Mountains. Before U.S. Route 101 was built through the Gaviota Pass, SR 154 was the main throughway to Santa Barbara and the tri city area including use as a stagecoach route in early years. After being replaced by US 101 as the primary route between the Santa Ynez Valley and Santa Barbara, SR 154 now serves as a scenic bypass.

Route description

It is a 2 lane road with some passing lanes, with the highest altitude being 2000 ft. It rivals US 101 for traffic, but it goes through the Los Padres National Forest and the San Marcos Pass. It starts in Los Olivos as a spur from US 101, goes through the town, and then the end of SR 246 at Santa Ynez. It then reaches Lake Cachuma and passes through the Los Padres National Forest, and across the Cold Spring Canyon Arch Bridge, where Cold Spring Tavern is on Stagecoach Road which passes below the bridge. Nearby it crosses Camino Cielo Road to the East and West, then the intersection of Painted Cave Road and Old San Marcos Road before descending to Santa Barbara. It then briefly becomes four lanes and passes an offramp for SR 192 (named Foothill Road to the East and Cathedral Oaks Road to the West of SR 154), before stopping at Calle Real and a Southbound onramp to US 101 and ending at the point where State Street to the East becomes Hollister Avenue to the West.

SR 154 is part of the California Freeway and Expressway System, and a portion in Santa Barbara is part of the National Highway System, a network of highways that are considered essential to the country's economy, defense, and mobility by the Federal Highway Administration. SR 154 is eligible for the State Scenic Highway System, and is officially designated as a scenic highway by the California Department of Transportation, meaning that it is a substantial section of highway passing through a "memorable landscape" with no "visual intrusions", where the potential designation has gained popular favor with the community.

History
The highway from Santa Barbara through San Marcos Pass to what was Route 2 was added to the state highway system in 1931. The route renumbered to SR 154 by the 1964 state highway renumbering.

Major intersections

See also

San Marcos Pass
Cold Spring Canyon Arch Bridge
Cold Spring Tavern

References

External links

Caltrans: Route 154 - Scenic Highway
California Highways: Route 154
California @ AARoads.com - State Route 154
Caltrans: Route 154 highway conditions

154
State Route 154
154
154
Historic trails and roads in California
Los Padres National Forest
Santa Ynez Mountains
Santa Barbara, California